Leslie Charles Reeves (22 June 1923 – 23 June 1967) was an Australian rules footballer in the Victorian Football League, (VFL).

Reeves was the nephew of Ray Niven and Colin Niven.

Prior to playing VFL football, Reeves served in the Australian Army during World War II.

References

External links
 
 

People educated at Wesley College (Victoria)
North Melbourne Football Club players
Australian rules footballers from Melbourne
1923 births
1967 deaths
People from Coburg, Victoria